This is a list of newspapers in Papua New Guinea.

The National
Papua New Guinea Post-Courier
Wantok Niuspepa
The Independent (defunct)

See also
Communications in Papua New Guinea
List of newspapers

Papua New Guinea
Newspapers

Newspapers